Norfolk is a town in Norfolk County, Massachusetts, United States, with a population of 11,662 people at the 2020 census. Formerly known as North Wrentham, Norfolk broke away to become an independent town in 1870.

History

Norfolk is a rural suburban town on the periphery of metropolitan Boston, located on an upper valley of the Charles River. There were a half dozen small farms in the town after 1669, the result of a determined effort to populate the colonial frontier. This was seen as a difficult task despite the good agricultural lands, fresh water fishing and fish runs because the settlement was so remote.

The town was abandoned during King Philip's War, its inhabitants relocating to Dedham in 1676. When Norfolk was eventually reestablished, the settlers relied on agriculture and cattle grazing with some considerable lumbering and planting of orchards. After 1812, three cotton manufacturing companies were established at Stony Brook, and later in the 19th century George Campbell's paper mill was opened at Highland Lake making heavy wrapping and building papers. The town saw a rapid increase in population after 1925 when a hospital and a state prison were built in Norfolk on the Walpole line. Major residential development took place before 1940 in the Pondville and Clark Streets section of town with scattered new housing along Seekonk and Main Streets, and suburban residential building has continued since.

Norfolk is located in eastern Massachusetts, bordered by Millis and Medfield on the north, Walpole on the east, Foxborough and Wrentham on the south, and Franklin and Medway on the west. Norfolk is 20 miles southwest of Boston; about 21 miles north of Providence, Rhode Island; and about 205 miles northeast of New York City.

In 2014, Norfolk was the filming location for Ted 2, a comedy film starring Mark Wahlberg and Seth MacFarlane.

Geography

Demographics

As of the 2000 census, there were 10,460 people, 2,818 households, and 2,412 families residing in Norfolk. The racial makeup of the town was 88.97% White, 4.90% African American, 0.31% Native American, 1.18% Asian, 0.02% Pacific Islander, 3.43% from other races, and 1.20% from two or more races. Hispanic or Latino of any race were 4.88% of the population.

There were 2,818 households, out of which 50.5% had children under the age of 18 living with them, 78.1% were married couples living together, 5.7% had a female householder with no husband present, and 14.4% were non-families. 10.8% of all households were made up of individuals, and 4.5% had someone living alone who was 65 years of age or older. The average household size was 3.08 and the average family size was 3.36.

In the town, the population was spread out, with 27.2% under the age of 18, 4.5% from 18 to 24, 36.9% from 25 to 44, 25.8% from 45 to 64, and 5.5% who were 65 years of age or older. The median age was 37 years. For every 100 females, there were 142.6 males. For every 100 females age 18 and over, there were 157.3 males.

The median income for a household in the town was $86,153, and the median income for a family was $92,001. Males had a median income of $60,926 versus $40,825 for females. The per capita income for the town was $32,454. About 0.8% of families and 1.1% of the population were below the poverty threshold, including 0.2% of those under age 18 and 3.9% of those age 65 or over.

Government

Local

Norfolk has a board of selectmen style government. The town is governed by three selectmen, each elected for three year staggered terms. The current members are Anita Mecklenburg, Kevin Kalkut, and Jim Lehan.  The town also elects a town clerk, assessors, constables, library trustees, planning board, recreation commission, board of health, housing authority, and school committee members. In total there exist 21 boards and committees in town.

State

The town is represented in the Massachusetts State Senate by Democrat Rebecca Rausch (Massachusetts Senate's Norfolk, Bristol and Middlesex district). She has served since 2019. Marcus Vaughn, a Republican, represents the town in the Massachusetts House of Representatives (9th Norfolk district).

Federal

Jake Auchincloss represents the town in the United States House of Representatives, and Elizabeth Warren and Edward Markey represent Plainville in the United States Senate.

Education
As of 2022, there are three public schools located within the town: the H. Olive Day Elementary School (grades Pre-K–2), the Freeman-Kennedy Elementary School (grades 3–6), and King Philip Regional Middle School (grades 7–8).

For secondary education Norfolk is in the King Philip Regional School District, which operates the public middle school and the comprehensive high school for Norfolk. Upon entering the 9th grade, students will go on to attend King Philip Regional High School in Wrentham, or specialty high schools operated by other agencies such as Tri-County Regional Vocational Technical High School in Franklin and Norfolk County Agricultural High School in Walpole. A new public library building recently opened on town hill. Inside the new library in 2009, a one-room school house, the original public library building, was reopened as a meeting room and historical landmark.

Transportation
In recent years, however, the airpark has been closed down and is currently in a state of disrepair. A seven house cul-de-sac known as Tailwind Cir now exists where the hangars used to stand while the remaining airport property is now conservation land known as Leland Wild.

The Norfolk MBTA commuter rail station is in Zone 5 and is located in the town's center at 9 Rockwood Road.

Emergency services
The Norfolk Police Department is a fairly small department located on Sharon Avenue in the south of town near the Norfolk–Wrentham town line. It is staffed by a total of 17 police officers, including the chief of police. The town's fire department and emergency medical services, located in the center of town on Main Street, was staffed full-time with 24h/7d coverage for the first time in April 2001, and since 2004 provides Advanced Life Support services. The Fire Department is staffed by 13 career firefighters, which includes the fire chief. The police and fire communications department (also known as dispatch) is operated by a total of four full-time dispatchers and six part-time dispatchers. All of these emergency services are located in the police station complex on Sharon Avenue.

At a special town meeting in December 2015, a small turnout of Norfolk voters approved a plan to construct a new police and public safety building on Sharon Street in the south part of town. The police department will be moved to this facility, with the fire department occupying the space vacated by the police. A regional communications center within the Public Safety Building will support the dispatch requirements of Norfolk and three surrounding towns: Wrentham, Plainville, and Franklin.

State prisons
Bay State Correctional Center (medium-security)
Massachusetts Correctional Institution – Cedar Junction (maximum-security; also lies partly across town line in neighboring Walpole)
Massachusetts Correctional Institution – Norfolk (medium security)
Pondville Correctional Center (minimum-security)

See also
 Stony Brook Wildlife Sanctuary, Norfolk

References

External links

Norfolk Public Library

 
Towns in Norfolk County, Massachusetts
Populated places established in 1678
Towns in Massachusetts
1870 establishments in Massachusetts